The Hispano-Suiza 14AB, a.k.a. Hispano-Suiza Type 80, was a 14-cylinder twin-row air-cooled radial engine. In 1929 the Hispano-Suiza company bought  a license to produce the Wright Whirlwind engine. The technology from that engine was used to produce a number of different radial engines with greater displacements, power, and number of cylinders.

The most significant of this series of engines was the 14AB, which was a very compact design with relatively good performance, and some 2,500 engines were produced. The 14AB suffered from cooling problems, and many aircraft originally designed for the 14AB were redesigned to use the more reliable Gnome-Rhône 14M series of engines or imported Wright and Pratt & Whitney R-1535 engines.

Variants
14AB-00
14AB-02
14AB-12800 hp
14AB-13800 hp

Applications
 Potez 630
 Breguet 691
 Zmaj R-1

Specifications (Hispano-Suiza 14AB-00)

See also

References

 Gunston, Bill. (1986). World Encyclopaedia of Aero Engines. Patrick Stephens: Wellingborough. p. 90

Hispano-Suiza aircraft engines
1920s aircraft piston engines
Aircraft air-cooled radial piston engines